Palijani railway station is located in Palijani village, Matyari district of Sindh province of the Pakistan.

See also
 List of railway stations in Pakistan
 Pakistan Railways

References

External links

Railway stations in Matiari District
Railway stations on Karachi–Peshawar Line (ML 1)